Cryptandra beverleyensis is a species of flowering plant in the family Rhamnaceae and is endemic to the southwest of Western Australia. It is a shrub with narrowly oblong leaves and clusters of white, tube-shaped flowers.

Description
Its young stems are densely hairy when young, later becoming glabrous. The upper surface of the leaves is glabrous and the edges are turned down or rolled under.

Taxonomy and naming
Cryptandra beverleyensis was first formally described in 2007 by Barbara Lynette Rye in the journal Nuytsia from specimens collected in 2003. The specific epithet (beverleyensis ) refers to Beverley, where this species has been collected.

Distribution and habitat
This cryptandra grows in woodland between Goomalling, Kellerberrin and Beaufort River in the Avon Wheatbelt and Jarrah Forest bioregions of south-western Western Australia.

Conservation status
Cryptandra beverleyensis is listed as "Priority Three" by the Government of Western Australia Department of Biodiversity, Conservation and Attractions, meaning that it is poorly known and known from only a few locations but is not under imminent threat.

References

beverleyensis
Rosales of Australia
Flora of Western Australia
Plants described in 2007